Xiliangfu, also known as Liangzhou, Lingchu Serkap, or the Liugu Tibetans, was a Tibetan tribal confederation that ruled modern Wuwei in Gansu Province, China. It gained independence from the Guiyi Circuit in the late 9th century and was conquered by the Tanguts of Western Xia and Uyghurs in 1015 and 1016.

History
In 996, Tanguts began raiding Liangzhou.

In 998, Xiliangfu had a population of 128,000.

In 1001, Panluozhi came to power.

In 1003, Li Jiqian occupied Liangzhou but failed to hold the city when their forces fell to a Tibetan ambush.

In 1004, Panluozhi was assassinated by Tanguts and his brother Siduodu succeeded him.

In 1006 and several following years Liangzhou suffered from plague.

In 1015, the Tanguts captured Liangzhou.

In 1016, the Ganzhou Uyghur Kingdom ousted the Tanguts from Liangzhou.

Around 1032, the Tanguts annexed Liangzhou again.

References

Bibliography

 
 

9th century in Tibet
Former countries in Chinese history